Almas Janadiluly Atayev (born 24 May 1981) is a Kazakhstani judoka.

He won the silver medal in the half-middleweight (81 kg) category of the 2006 Asian Games, having lost the final match to Damdinsürengiin Nyamkhüü of Mongolia.

He currently resides in Öskemen.

External links
2006 Asian Games profile

1981 births
Living people
Kazakhstani male judoka
Asian Games medalists in judo
Judoka at the 2006 Asian Games
Asian Games silver medalists for Kazakhstan
Medalists at the 2006 Asian Games
20th-century Kazakhstani people
21st-century Kazakhstani people